Cletus or Cleatus may refer to:

Characters
 Cletus Spuckler, a fictional character in The Simpsons
 Cletus Hogg, a deputy in the TV show The Dukes of Hazzard
 Cletus Kasady, a Marvel Comics supervillain, also known as Carnage
 Cletus Klump, a character on The Nutty Professor and its sequel
 Cleatus, a minor character on Good Times
 Cletus, a fictional character in the  Deponia video game series
 Cledus Snow, a character in Smokey and the Bandit

People

Religion
 Pope Anacletus (died c. 92), third Bishop of Rome
 Antipope Anacletus II (died 1138), ruled in opposition to Pope Innocent II
 Cletus Bél (died 1245), Hungarian prelate

Sports
 Cletus Andersson (1893–1971), Swedish water polo player
 Clete Blakeman (born 1964), American football official
 Cletus Clark  (born 1962), retired male hurdler from the United States
 Cletus Seldin (born 1986), American boxer

Other people
 Cletus Dunn (born 1948), former civil servant and Canadian politician
 Cletus Ibeto  (born 1952), Nigerian businessman
 Cletus Mendis (born 1949), Sri Lankan actor
 Cletus Wotorson (born 1937), Liberian politician and geologist

Other uses
 Cletus (bug), a genus of leaf-footed bugs in the tribe Gonocerini
 Cleatus the Robot, the robot mascot of Fox NFL Sunday and all of Fox Sports

See also 
 Clete Boyer (Cletis Boyer), former baseball player
 Cleitus (disambiguation)
 Cletis (disambiguation)

Masculine given names
English masculine given names